Kurdistan Toilers' Party founded according to the party in 1985, is a splinter from the Kurdistan Socialist Party, and later a member of the Iraqi Kurdistan Front. Led by Khalid Zangana, now it is led by Qadir Aziz.

It publishes the newspaper Alay Azadi (Banner of Freedom) in Sulaymaniyya. A few cultural and ideological periodicals (Pesh Kawtin and Nojan) are also reportedly published and television and radio programmes put out on its own broadcasting stations. It was included in the Patriotic Union of Kurdistan-dominated government. It has poor relations with the Kurdistan Democratic Party and has no offices in Kurdistan Democratic Party territory.

Currently it has one seat in Kurdistan parliament and one minister in the Kurdistan Regional Government.

Kurdistan Toilers' Party is part of the Kurdistan Alliance Bloc ("Hawpeymanî Kurdistan", no. 372) to the Iraqi Parliament. The first listed candidate for Silêmanî Governorate for the party was Jalal Dabagh, a prominent Kurdish politician.

The leader of Kurdistan Toilers Party is Balen Abdullah.

See also
Jalal Dabagh

References

1985 establishments in Iraq
Kurdish nationalism in Iraq
Kurdish nationalist political parties
Kurdish political parties in Iraq
Left-wing nationalist parties
Political parties established in 1985
Political parties in Kurdistan Region
Socialist parties in Iraq